SAP Business Suite is a bundle of business applications that provide integration of information and processes, collaboration, industry-specific functionality and scalability.
SAP Business Suite is based on SAP's technology platform called NetWeaver.

SAP Business Suite 7 has five constituents:

SAP ERP 6.0 (Enterprise Resource Planning)
SAP CRM 7.0 (Customer Relationship Management)
SAP SRM 7.0 (Supplier Relationship Management)
SAP SCM 7.0 (Supply Chain Management)
SAP PLM 7.0 (Product Lifecycle Management)

References

External links
SAP Business Suite

Business Suite